The black-crowned antshrike or western slaty antshrike (Thamnophilus atrinucha) is a species of bird in the family Thamnophilidae.
It is found in from western Ecuador, western Colombia, western Venezuela, and Central America as far north as Belize.

It was previously included in the widespread slaty antshrike (T. punctatus), but following the split, this scientific name is now restricted to the northern slaty antshrike.

Gallery

References

External links

Species Account Cornell Lab of Ornithology, Neotropical Birds

black-crowned antshrike
Birds of Honduras
Birds of Nicaragua
Birds of Costa Rica
Birds of Panama
Birds of Colombia
Birds of Ecuador
Birds of the Tumbes-Chocó-Magdalena
black-crowned antshrike
black-crowned antshrike
black-crowned antshrike
Taxonomy articles created by Polbot